The 1997 Jacksonville Jaguars season was the franchise's 3rd season in the National Football League and the 3rd under head coach Tom Coughlin. The team won 11 games and made the playoffs as a wild card team, but lost their first game to the Denver Broncos.

The team also made a couple of changes to the uniforms. They changed the numbers to new font style numbers and added black side panels to the uniforms. During the offseason, the team had changed the font style numbers on the jerseys to a skinnier style with a black drop shadow in the back of the numbers. During the team's 1997 preseason games there were several complaints that the announcers and the viewers had a hard time recognizing the numbers on the players, so the team decided to make the jersey numbers wider and removed the drop shadow numbers by the beginning of the regular season.

Offseason

Draft

Personnel

Staff

Roster

Regular season

Schedule

Note: Intra-division opponents are in bold text.

Standings

Postseason

Schedule

Game summaries

AFC Wild Card Playoffs: vs (4) Denver Broncos

After upsetting the Broncos in the playoffs in the previous year, the Jaguars fell short in the re-match. John Elway lead the Broncos to a 42–17 win over the visiting Jaguars, throwing for 223 yards and a touchdown. Mark Brunell was 18 for 32 for 203 yards, but had no touchdowns on top of an interception. Similar to the year before when the Broncos could not stop Natrone Means and the Jaguars running game, the Jaguars struggled all game to contain the Broncos running attack. Terrell Davis carried 31 times for 184 yards and two touchdowns. Nonetheless, the game was close throughout, as the Broncos led by only 21-17 late in the 3rd. But the Broncos would score 21 unanswered points in the 4th quarter, ending the Jaguars season.

Awards and records
 Mike Hollis, franchise record (tied), most field goals in one game, 5 field goals (November 30, 1997)
 Mike Hollis, franchise record, most field goals in one season (tied), 31 field goals
 Mike Hollis, franchise record, most points in one season, 134 points
 James Stewart, franchise record, most touchdowns in one game, 5 touchdowns (October 12, 1997)
 James Stewart, franchise record, most points in one game, 30 points (October 12, 1997)

References

External links
 Jaguars on Pro Football Reference
 Jaguars Schedule on jt-sw.com

Jacksonville Jaguars
Jacksonville Jaguars seasons
Jacksonville Jaguars